The lynching of Leander Shaw occurred near midnight on July 29, 1908, in Pensacola, Florida. Shaw was accused of the attempted murder and rape of 21-year-old Lillie Davis. Shaw, being positively identified by Davis, was arrested and taken to jail. On the night of July 29, an angry mob shot the Escambia County Sheriff and hung Leander Shaw in Plaza Ferdinand VII.

Assault of Davis and arrest of Shaw 
Earlier on July 29, 1908, 21-year-old Lillie Davis was beaten and found, a victim of assault in her Gull Point home. Davis' husband absent at the time, the assailant raped her, slit her throat, beat her in the head with a Colt revolver he’d stolen from the home, and then fled. Davis' daughter had also been struck. Davis was taken to a nearby hospital.

Two hours later, a sheriff’s deputy arrested Leander Shaw near the bridge over Bayou Texar, “realizing in an instant he had caught the negro brute.” The still-bloody knife and stolen revolver were reportedly found on Shaw. Shaw was taken to the hospital Davis was being treated at, where she recognized Shaw in an instant as the man responsible for the assault. Shaw was taken into custody and was held at the county jail. Lillie Davis died three days later, on August 1.

Lynching of Shaw 
By 7:00 p.m., a crowd began to form outside of the Escambia County Jail. Sheriff of Escambia County James C. Van Pelt, after unsuccessfully trying to convince the mob to disperse, was quoted by the Pensacola News Journal:

At 8:45, the mob stormed the jail, using a section of the streetcar rail to break down the jail yard gate. There was a volley from the second story windows of the jail building, where several deputies were stationed. Sheriff Van Pelt talked for thirty minutes before him and his deputies opened fire on the mob. A firefight began, several men on both sides being injured. Two people died, including "Bud" Nichols, a member of the mob who was shot in the head, and street car conductor Henry C. Kellum, who was shot in the heart accidentally, when the revolver of Sheriff Van Pelt was discharged while in his pocket.

At about 11:30, about a dozen members of the mob scaled the rear wall of the jail and entered the backyard. Proceeding quietly, while the officers were busily engaged with the mob in front, the dozen men leaped upon them, kept a number of them to the floor, while others kept deputies at gunpoint. Keys to the jail were taken from Deputy Cusachs. The mob took Shaws, attached a noose to his neck, and dragged him through east on Zarragossa street to Tarragona, before taking him to Plaza Ferdinand VII, where the crowd attached the rope to an electric pole, hung him, and shot his body with more than 500 bullets. In the final attack, H. C. Kellum was also killed. It is believed that Kellum received his death wound when a group of four or five men were engaged in overpowering Van Pelt.

See also 
 History of Pensacola, Florida
 List of lynching victims in the United States
 Timeline of Pensacola, Florida

References 

1908 deaths
1908 in Florida
1908 murders in the United States
African-American history between emancipation and the civil rights movement
American murder victims
Crimes in Florida
July 1908 events
Pensacola, Florida
Lynching deaths in Florida
Murdered African-American people
People murdered in Florida
Racially motivated violence against African Americans
White American riots in the United States